Flavobacterium chungangense is a Gram-negative, rod-shaped and aerobic bacterium from the genus of Flavobacterium which has been isolated from a freshwater lake from the Chung-Ang University in Anseong in Korea.

References

External links
Type strain of Flavobacterium chungangense at BacDive -  the Bacterial Diversity Metadatabase

chungangense
Bacteria described in 2009